Papantoniou is a Greek surname. According to Greek naming conventions, these people are descendant of a priest named Antonis. Notable people with the surname include:

Epameinondas Papantoniou (born 1990), Greek professional basketball player
Evelina Papantoniou (born 1979), Greek fashion model and actress
Giannis Papantoniou
Ioanna Papantoniou
Nondas Papantoniou
Yiannos Papantoniou (born 1949), Greek politician
Zacharias Papantoniou (1877–1940), Greek writer and journalist

See also
Antoniou

Greek-language surnames
Surnames
Patronymic surnames